Ngwatle is a village in Kgalagadi District of Botswana. It is located in the Kalahari Desert, in the north-west part of the district. The population was 271 in 2011 census.

References

Kgalagadi District
Villages in Botswana